Glenn Spencer (September 11, 1905 – December 30, 1958) was a Major League Baseball pitcher who played five seasons with the Pittsburgh Pirates and the New York Giants of the National League from 1928 to 1933. His best season came in 1931 when he went 11–12 with a 3.42 earned run average in 38 games.

External links 
Baseball-reference profile

1905 births
1958 deaths
Baseball players from New York (state)
Major League Baseball pitchers
New York Giants (NL) players
Pittsburgh Pirates players
Binghamton Triplets players
Columbia Comers players
Columbus Red Birds players
Dallas Steers players
Houston Buffaloes players
Knoxville Smokies players
Oswego Netherlands players
Pittsfield Electrics players
Rochester Red Wings players
St. Paul Saints (AA) players
Wichita Aviators players
Williamsport Grays players